Acacia heterophylla, the highland tamarind, is a tree (or shrub in its higher places) endemic to Réunion island where it is commonly named tamarin des hauts The tree has a juvenile stage where its leaves have a pinnate arrangement, but in the adult stage the leaves diminish and the phyllode becomes the dominant photosynthetic structure.

It has been introduced into Madagascar where it grows in a subhumid climate at an altitude of about 500–1000 m above sea level.

Genetic sequence analysis has shown its closest relative is Acacia koa of Hawaii; the estimated time of divergence is about 1.4 million years ago. A. heterophylla sequences nest within those of the more diverse A. koa, making the latter species paraphyletic. Both species are descended from an ancestral species in Australia, presumably their sister species, Acacia melanoxylon; the means of dispersal to Hawaii and then to Réunion (the latter trip a distance of 18,000 km) is thought to have been seed-carrying by birds such as petrels (the seeds of these species are not adapted for prolonged immersion in seawater). Both species also have very similar ecological niches, which differ from that of A. melanoxylon.

References

External links 

heterophylla
Endemic flora of Réunion